Abyaneh (also Romanized as Ābyāneh, Ābiāneh, and Abyāneh) is a village in Barzrud Rural District, in the Central District of Natanz County, Isfahan Province, Iran. At the 2006 census, its population was 305, in 160 families.  

Since June 2005, the village has been undergoing archaeological excavations for the first time ever, as a result of an agreement between Abyaneh Research Center and the Archaeology Research Center of the Iranian Cultural Heritage and Tourism Organization (ICHTO).

Photo gallery

References 
</ref>

External links 

 Abyaneh Magazine

Populated places in Natanz County
Archaeological sites in Iran
Castles in Iran
Sasanian castles
Architecture in Iran
Tourist attractions in Isfahan Province